Jicaquean, also known as Tolan, is a small language family of Honduras.  There are two attested Jicaquean languages, Tol (Eastern Jicaque) and Western Jicaque (Holt 1999), which Campbell (1997) reports were about as distant as English and Swedish.  Only Tol survives.

Classification
Prior to an influential paper by Greenberg and Swadesh in 1953 Tol (a.k.a. Eastern Jicaque) was thought to be a language isolate, i.e., there existed no knowledge as to its possible genetic affinities. They argued that Tol should be added to the Hokan stock, a large language stock, phylum or family, which was proposed by R. B. Dixon and Alfred D. Kroeber in 1913. In 1977, David Oltrogge proposed to link Tol to the extinct Subtiaba language of Nicaragua, and also to Chontal of Oaxaca, also known as Tequistlateco. This indirectly amounted to a mere sub-classification, since all of the three languages in question were part of the proposed Hokan stock. A couple of years later, Campbell and Oltrogge published a reconstruction of Jicaquean phonemes, based on the available information on Western and Eastern Jicaque. In that same paper they expressed strong doubt in the Hokan affiliation of Tol and mild enthusiasm regarding the possible link to Chontal of Oaxaca, but stressed that much more information was needed to be able to say anything reasonable. More recently, Kaufman has expressed his continuing support of the Hokan affiliation of Tol.

Granberry & Vescelius (2004) speculate that the extinct Ciguayo language of Hispaniola might have its most likely relatives in the Tolan languages.

Proto-language

Proto-Jicaque reconstructions by Campbell and Oltrogge (1980):

References

 Campbell, Lyle. (1979). "Middle American languages." In L. Campbell & M. Mithun (Eds.), The languages of native America: Historical and comparative assessment (pp. 902–1000). Austin: University of Texas Press.
 Campbell, Lyle. (1997). American Indian Languages, The Historical Linguistics of Native America. Oxford Studies in Anthropological Linguistics. Oxford: Oxford UP.
 Campbell, Lyle, and David Oltrogge (1980). "Proto-Tol (Jicaque)." International Journal of American Linguistics, 46:205-223.
 Granberry, Julian, and Gary Vescelius (2004). Languages of the Pre-Columbian Antilles. Birmingham: University of Alabama Press.
 Greenberg, Joseph H., and Morris Swadesh (1953). "Jicaque as a Hokan Language." International Journal of American Linguistics 19: 216-222.
 Holt, Dennis. (1999). Tol (Jicaque). Languages of the World/Materials 170. Munich: LincomEuropa.

External links

Jicaquean basic lexicon at the Global Lexicostatistical Database

 
Language families
Hokan languages
Indigenous languages of Mexico
Indigenous languages of Central America
Languages of Honduras

br:Toleg
hr:Jicaque Indijanci